There are over 20,000 Grade II* listed buildings in England. This page is a list of these buildings in the district of Wealden in East Sussex.

Wealden

|}

Notes

External links

Lists of Grade II* listed buildings in East Sussex
Grade II* listed buildings in East Sussex